Loveland Pass is a high mountain pass in north-central Colorado, at an elevation of  above sea level in the Rocky Mountains of the Western United States.

Background

It is located on the Continental Divide in the Front Range, west of Denver on U.S. Highway 6 (US 6). The twisty road is considered to be especially treacherous during the winter months. A steep, steady 6.7% grade, along with numerous hairpin turns on either side, make it difficult to snowplow the road regularly.

The pass is named for William A.H. Loveland, the president of the Colorado Central Railroad and a resident of Golden during the late 19th century. The city of Loveland, in Larimer County near Fort Collins, is also named after him. Loveland held a railroad charter and was an advocate for a wagon road between Denver and Leadville. In 1869, he opened this section of wagon road now known as Loveland Pass. It would be abandoned in 1906 and then restored for vehicle use in 1920 by the U.S. Forest Service.

Loveland is the highest mountain pass in Colorado that regularly stays open during a snowy winter season. When the Eisenhower Tunnel opened in March 1973, it allowed motorists on Interstate 70 (I-70) to avoid crossing the pass directly. The same is true for bicyclists, pedestrians, and those drivers who wish to stop along the road to admire the scenery.

Loveland Ski Area is located north west of the pass, and Arapahoe Basin is on the south/southeast side. The pass itself is a popular destination for backcountry skiers. Occasionally during the winter, the pass road may be closed by a blizzard and all traffic must use the tunnel, even the normally forbidden vehicles carrying hazardous materials. In the event of less serious winter storms, chain restrictions are often imposed. At the Loveland Pass parking lot, visitors can access trails to the summits of Mount Sniktau and other nearby mountain peaks.

Incidents

Plane crash

The plane carried members of the Wichita State University football team, as well as coaches, administrators, and boosters. The cause was attributed to several pilot errors.

Avalanche
On April 20, 2013, an avalanche at Loveland Pass killed five snowboarders in the deadliest avalanche in Colorado since 1962. A sixth snowboarder involved in the incident survived, and was extracted by a search and rescue team.

See also

List of Colorado mountain passes
List of Colorado mountain ranges
List of Colorado mountain summits

References

External links

Colorado Road Conditions and Closings
Loveland Pass Backcountry Skier Information

Avalanches in the United States
Great Divide of North America
Mountain passes of Colorado
Landforms of Clear Creek County, Colorado
Landforms of Summit County, Colorado
Transportation in Clear Creek County, Colorado
Transportation in Summit County, Colorado
U.S. Route 6